Lasha Salukvadze (born 21 December 1981) is a Georgian football coach and a former player. He is an assistant coach with the Georgian national under-21 team.

Career

Club
In July 2013 Salukvadze signed for Azerbaijan Premier League side Inter Baku on a two-year contract.

International
At international level, he played 7 games in UEFA Euro 2008 qualifying for Georgia.
On 11 March 2010, he appeared to 'purposely' stamp on Edin Dzeko's face in a 1–1 home draw in the UEFA Europa League.

Career statistics

International

Statistics accurate as of 9 June 2015.

Honours
Lokomotivi Tbilisi
Georgian Cup (2): 1999–2000, 2001–02
Dinamo Tbilisi
Umaglesi Liga (1): 2004–05
Rubin Kazan
Russian Premier League (2): 2008, 2009
Dila Gori
Georgian Cup (1): 2011–12

References

External links
 

1981 births
Footballers from Tbilisi
Living people
Footballers from Georgia (country)
Georgia (country) under-21 international footballers
Georgia (country) international footballers
Association football defenders
FC Lokomotivi Tbilisi players
FC Dinamo Tbilisi players
FC Rubin Kazan players
FC Volga Nizhny Novgorod players
FC Dila Gori players
FC SKA-Khabarovsk players
Shamakhi FK players
Erovnuli Liga players
Russian Premier League players
Russian First League players
Azerbaijan Premier League players
Expatriate footballers from Georgia (country)
Expatriate footballers in Russia
Expatriate sportspeople from Georgia (country) in Russia
Expatriate sportspeople from Georgia (country) in Azerbaijan
Football managers from Georgia (country)